Melanthera nivea, also known as pineland squarestem, snow squarestem and , is a species of flowering plant in the family Asteraceae. It grows in the Americas.

Distribution
It is found in the SE United States, including Louisiana, Mississippi Alabama, Georgia, Florida, South Carolina, Tennessee, Kentucky and Illinois, as well as in the Caribbean Islands, Mexico (from Tamaulipas to Quintana Roo), Central America and South America, including Colombia, Venezuela, Ecuador, Guianas and northern Brazil.

References

External links

nivea